Colchicum speciosum is a species of flowering plant in the family Colchicaceae, native to mountainous areas of northern Turkey, the Caucasus and northern Iran. The strap-like leaves grow in the spring, then yellow, wither and die back as summer progresses. The flowers strongly resemble those of the crocus, the familiar spring-flowering bulb; hence the common name autumn crocus which is applied to this and other colchicum species. However the two genera belong to different families; and there is in fact an autumn-flowering crocus species, Crocus sativus, the source of the spice saffron. By contrast, all parts of Colchicum speciosum are toxic if ingested.

Cultivation
Colchicum speciosum is a vigorous grower and does well in full sun to partial shade and well-drained soils in most climates. It is valued in gardens for its late flowering at the end of summer and into autumn.

Cultivars include the white 'Album' and the amethyst-purple ‘Atrorubens’ which have gained the Royal Horticultural Society's Award of Garden Merit (confirmed 2017).

References

speciosum
Plants described in 1829
Flora of Turkey
Flora of Iran
Flora of Georgia (country)
Flora of Armenia
Flora of Azerbaijan
Flora of Russia